Chromolaena oteroi, the Mona Island thoroughwort, is a species of flowering shrub in the family Asteraceae. It has been found only on Mona Island, a small island between Puerto Rico and Hispaniola in the West Indies and politically a part of the Commonwealth of Puerto Rico.

The shrub, with its pale purple flowers, was named after botanist José I. Otero.

References

oteroi
Flora of Puerto Rico
Plants described in 1948
Flora without expected TNC conservation status